Winrow is an English-language surname which may refer to:

Craig Winrow (born 1971), English middle-distance runner
Harry Winrow (1916–1973), English cricketer
Jason Winrow (1971–2012), American football offensive guard
Robert Winrow (1910–1999), Scottish cricketer

English-language surnames